Mazarambroz is a municipality located in the province of Toledo, Castile-La Mancha, Spain. According to the 2006 census (INE), the municipality has a population of 1314 inhabitants.

Archaeology
In Roman times there was a reservoir supplying the city of Toledo via an aqueduct. There are some remains of the dam.

Ecology
 
It is one of the areas in the Montes de Toledo where the Iberian lynx has been reintroduced.

See also
Alcantarilla Dam

References

External links

Municipalities in the Province of Toledo